Cloak Without Dagger is a 1956 British thriller film directed by Joseph Sterling and starring Philip Friend, Mary Mackenzie and Leslie Dwyer. It was released in the USA as Operation Conspiracy

Plot
A fashion reporter is united with a former boyfriend, after a chance meeting, and helps him to track down an enemy spy.

Cast
 Philip Friend as Major Felix Gratton 
 Mary Mackenzie as Kyra Gabaine 
 Leslie Dwyer as Fred Borcombe 
 Allan Cuthbertson as Colonel Packham 
 John G. Heller as Peppi Gilroudian Dress Designer 
 Chin Yu as Yan Chu 
 Bill Nagy as Mario Oromonda 
 Patrick Jordan as Captain Willis 
 Marianne Stone as Mrs. Markley 
 Frank Thornton as Mr. Markley 
 Gerrey Levey as Night club entertainer 
 Boris Ranevsky as Antoine 
 María Mercedes as Spanish girl 
 Larry Taylor as Sergeant Blake

Critical reception
The Radio Times described it as "an uncomfortable mix of romance and mystery" ; while Britmovie called it a "light-hearted spy story with a touch of romance."

References

External links

1956 films
1950s thriller films
British thriller films
Butcher's Film Service films
1950s English-language films
1950s British films
British black-and-white films